= Dollars Colony =

Residential area of Bangalore, India

Dollars Colony is an upmarket residential area in Bangalore, India. It is situated towards the south of Bangalore Central Business District. It is located 874 meters above mean sea level.

Many Non-Resident Indians stay there, the name Dollars Colony being thus due to the locality.

== Overview ==
This colony is actually in Nagashettyhalli area about 300 meters from Nagashettyhalli local bus stand. Adjacent to it and towards western side is the RMV (Raj Mahal Vilas) Phase II HIG Colony. There is the prestigious RMV club in the RMV II HIG Colony area having all the indoor games facilities and also has a function hall and attached catering. There is a tree park in the RMV II HIG Colony where people go in the morning and evening for walks in the park. The park has open air free manual gym which is an attractive item in the area.

In this area there is a multi storeyed housing complex known as Pebble Bay consisting of six towers 22 storeys each composed of lavish three- or four-bedroom flats. This housing complex is well known in this area and has a club house and shopping store of its own.

== Nearby market places ==
There are many markets in this area. The nearest is at about 0.5 km distance and known as Sanjay Nagar main road market. At about 1 km distance another prominent market is there known as New Bel Road market. In fact Nagashettyhalli area is dotted with small small shops in the main as well as cross roads in this area and all of them are accessible within a distance of 1 km.

== Air ==
The Bangalore airport is about 29 km from there and in normal traffic hours takes 35-40 minutes time by taxi.

== Rail ==
Lottegollahalli and Hebbal are the nearest railway stations. Bangalore City Junction is the major railway station and is 7 kilometres (4.3 mi) distant. Yeshwanthpur Junction is another major railway station and is 3.9 kilometres (2.4 mi) distant.

== Road ==
Bangalore, Yelahanka, Bommanahalli, Krishnarajapura, Kengeri, Hosakote, Dasarahalli, Devanahalli, Doddaballapura, Magadi, Nelamangala are the nearby by towns to Bangalore having road connectivity to Bangalore and Dollars Colony.

== Bus ==
Lottegollahalli Railway Colony Bus Station, Nagashettyhalli Bus Station, Devasandra (Rajmahal Vilas) Bus Station, Lottegollahalli Bus Station, Patelappa Layout Bus Station are the nearby by Local Bus Stops to Dollars Colony.
